Robert Lee Nelson (born June 30, 1953 in Stillwater, Minnesota) is a retired American football linebacker in the National Football League. He played for the Buffalo Bills, the San Francisco 49ers, and the Oakland/Los Angeles Raiders. He started in Super Bowl XV and in Super Bowl XVIII for the Raiders.  Nelson played college football at the University of Nebraska.

External links
NFL.com player page

1953 births
Living people
People from Stillwater, Minnesota
Players of American football from Minnesota
American football linebackers
Nebraska Cornhuskers football players
Buffalo Bills players
San Francisco 49ers players
Oakland Raiders players
Los Angeles Raiders players